Harrys Depot  is a theatre in Freiburg im Breisgau in Baden-Württemberg, Germany.

External links 
Homepage

Theatres in Baden-Württemberg
Tourist attractions in Freiburg im Breisgau